Every Woman is a syndicated television series produced by Entertainment Studios and created by Byron Allen. Heidi Klum made a guest appearance on the show in 2011.

External links
 Official website

2007 American television series debuts
2000s American reality television series
2010s American reality television series
2000s American documentary television series
2010s American documentary television series
First-run syndicated television programs in the United States
English-language television shows
Television series by Entertainment Studios
2012 American television series endings